Rugby union in Ukraine is a minor but growing sport, with a history dating back over six decades.

Governing Body
The Ukrainian Union was founded in 1991, and joined the IRB in 1992, after independence. Although there was a union formed in the sixties, it was not considered a proper national union until after the breakup of the USSR.

History

Soviet Period
Rugby union was played in the Russian Empire as early as in 1908. In 1934 the Moscow Championship was started, and in 1936 the first Soviet Championship took place.

In 1949, rugby union was forbidden in the USSR during the "fight against the cosmopolitanism". The competitions were resumed in 1957, and the Soviet Championship in 1966. In 1975 the Soviet national team played their first match.
Ukraine had its own rugby team in the USSR, but it was not treated as a proper national side.

Post-independence
Rugby union arrived in Ukraine during the post-War Soviet period. Ukraine was not a stronghold of rugby in the USSR - the game was mainly played in Russia and Georgia, but it was stronger there, than certain other republics. The game has experienced some growth in the post-independence period, particularly the 1990s, when former USSR team coach Igor Bokov helped run the game there.

Ukrainian rugby has strong ties with the military, with the strongest side being the airforce Aviator Kyiv.

Like many other minor rugby nations, the game tend to be centred on the capital, Kyiv.

Naturally, Ukrainian rugby has been affected by social and economic conditions since independence. In 2006, the Kyiv Post reported that the junior rugby coach for Ukraine had been attacked, being run down, and then shot four times, twice in the head.

See also 

 Ukraine national rugby union team
 Ukraine Rugby Superliga
 Soviet Union national rugby union team

References 

 Poland Tapping into French Rugby Roots

External links
 IRB Ukraine page
  Official webpage
  Ukrainian rugby portal
 Archives du Rugby: Ukraine